Kalynivka is a rural settlement in Dovzhansk Raion, Luhansk Oblast of eastern Ukraine, at about 50 km SSE from the centre of Luhansk.

The settlement was taken under control of pro-Russian forces during the War in Donbass, that started in 2014.

References

Villages in Dovzhansk Raion